John Tindale (born 9 October 1967) is a former English cricketer.  Tindale was a right-handed batsman who bowled right-arm medium-fast.  He was born in Durham, County Durham.

Tindale made his debut for Durham against Bedfordshire in 1988 Minor Counties Championship.  He played Minor counties cricket for Durham from 1988 to 1990, making 17 Minor Counties Championship appearances and 2 MCCA Knockout Trophy appearances.  He made his only List A appearance against Somerset in the 1988 NatWest Trophy.  He scored 30 runs in this match, before being stumped by Neil Burns off the bowling of Steve Waugh.

References

External links
John Tindale at ESPNcricinfo
John Tindale at CricketArchive

1967 births
Living people
Sportspeople from Durham, England
Cricketers from County Durham
English cricketers
Durham cricketers